, also known as JoJo's Bizarre Adventure: The Animation, is a Japanese anime television series produced by David Production. An adaptation of the Japanese manga series of the same name by Hirohiko Araki, the series focuses on the mysterious adventures of the Joestar family across generations, from the end of the 19th century to modern times. The series was first broadcast on Tokyo MX before entering syndication on 4 JNN stations, BS11, and Animax.

The first season, adapting the first two parts, Phantom Blood and Battle Tendency, aired in Japan between October 2012 and April 2013. The series is distributed in North America by Warner Bros. Home Entertainment and Viz Media, with the former handling the series on DVD and the latter handling the series on Blu-Ray and the merchandising rights. In the United States, it aired on Adult Swim's Toonami programming block starting in October 2016.

A second season adapting the manga's third part, Stardust Crusaders, aired between April and September 2014, with a second part airing between January and June 2015. A third season covering the fourth part, Diamond Is Unbreakable, aired from April to December 2016. A fourth season covering the fifth part, Golden Wind, aired from October 2018 to July 2019. A fifth season covering the sixth part, Stone Ocean, was released worldwide on Netflix from December 2021 to December 2022. As of December 2022, the series consists of 190 episodes.

Premise

JoJo's Bizarre Adventure tells the story of the Joestar family, a family whose various members discover they are destined to take down supernatural foes using powers that they possess. The story is split up into unique parts, each following a member of the Joestar family, who typically have names that can be abbreviated to the titular "JoJo".

Release

On July 5, 2012, at a press conference celebrating the 25th anniversary of JoJo's Bizarre Adventure and promoting series creator Hirohiko Araki's then-upcoming art exhibition, Araki and his people announced that an anime adaptation of JoJo's Bizarre Adventure was in production and would premiere in October 2012. In August 2012, it was announced that the series would be produced by David Production. The first season of JoJo's Bizarre Adventure covered the first two parts of the manga, Phantom Blood and Battle Tendency. It aired for 26 episodes on Tokyo MX between October 6, 2012 and April 6, 2013.

Although teased at in the post-credit scenes of the finale, the second season of the anime series, which covered the third part of the manga, Stardust Crusaders, was officially announced in the 47th issue of Weekly Shōnen Jump and the fifth tankōbon volume of JoJolion in October 2013. It was broadcast on Tokyo MX in two parts for a total of 48 episodes; the first from April 5 to September 13, 2014, and the second from January 10 to June 20, 2015. The Japanese broadcast censored scenes of underage characters smoking by overlaying black shadows on them. 

In October 2015, at the "Last Crusaders" event for Stardust Crusaders, a third season and adaptation of the fourth part of the manga, Diamond Is Unbreakable, was announced. It premiered on April 1, 2016 and ended on December 23, 2016. An original video animation (OVA) adapting the Thus Spoke Rohan Kishibe manga spin-offs to people who had purchased all thirteen Japanese DVD or Blu-ray volumes of the Diamond Is Unbreakable anime series. 

On June 21, 2018, at the "Ripples of Adventure" art exhibition, a fourth season and adaptation of the fifth part of the manga, Golden Wind, was announced . The pilot debuted at Anime Expo on July 6, 2018, and formally aired from October 5, 2018 to July 28, 2019 on Tokyo MX. 

On April 4, 2021, at the JOESTAR The Inherited Soul, which featured the cast of main characters from each part of the series, it was announced a fifth season and adaptation of the sixth part of the manga, Stone Ocean.

With the 2014 premiere of Stardust Crusaders, American-based website Crunchyroll began streaming the anime series for viewers outside Japan an hour after it aired in Japan. Warner Bros. Home Entertainment released Parts 1 and 2 in a DVD set on September 22, 2015, with an English dub. In July 2016, Viz Media announced they acquired the Blu-ray rights to the series and released it with an English dub in July 2017. On October 15, 2016, American cable block Adult Swim began airing the anime on its Toonami block.

Reception
At the 2013 CEDEC Awards, the anime's opening sequence won in the Visual Arts division. The first DVD release of the TV anime was the fourth best-selling animation DVD in Japan for the week of January 28 to February 3, 2013, with 4,510 copies sold. Its Blu-ray version was the fourth best-selling animation Blu-ray for that same week, with 14,860 copies sold. The second volume ranked sixth in both animation DVDs and Blu-rays for the week of February 18–24, with 2,764 and 12,501 copies sold respectively. The anime's third volume was the sixth best-selling animation DVD, with 2,994 copies sold, and the second best-selling animation Blu-ray, with 13,536 copies sold, for the week of March 25–31.

See also
JoJo's Bizarre Adventure – An earlier OVA adaptation, 13 episodes released in two parts. The first 6 episodes were released during 1993–1994 and the later (but narratively earlier) 7 episodes were released during 2000–2002 by Studio APPP. This series was adapted from Part 3: Stardust Crusaders of the original manga, also the basis for the 2nd season of the 2012 TV series.

Notes

References

External links
  
 
 

2012 anime television series debuts
2014 anime television series debuts
2016 anime television series debuts
2018 anime television series debuts
2021 anime ONAs
2022 anime television series debuts
Adventure anime and manga
Anime series based on manga
David Production
Fantasy anime and manga

Supernatural anime and manga
Television censorship in Japan
Television shows about psychic powers
Television shows written by Yasuko Kobayashi
Tokyo MX original programming
Toonami
Vampires in anime and manga
Viz Media anime
Muse Communication